Carrie De Mar (April 1, 1875/76 - February 23, 1963) was an American actress, singer and vaudevillian.  She appeared often with her husband Joseph Hart on stage and early silent screens. The duo starred in a series of early Biograph shorts titled Foxy Granpa. Joe Hart died in 1921 and years later Carrie entered a Convent (1950).

She died of a stroke in early 1963.

Filmography
The Creators of Foxy Grandpa (1902) short
Foxy Grandpa Shows Boys He is a Magician (1902) short
Foxy Grandpa and Polly in a Little Hilarity (1902) short
Boys Take Grandpa's Cigars with Distressing Results 1902

References

External links

 

1870s births
1963 deaths
People from Scranton, Pennsylvania
Actors from Scranton, Pennsylvania
19th-century American actresses
American musical theatre actresses